Emmanuel Pontremoli (13 January 1865 – 25 July 1956) was a French architect and archaeologist.

Biography
Born in Nice, Alpes-Maritimes, a student in the atelier of Louis-Jules André, in 1890 he won the Prix de Rome in the architecture category and in 1922 became a member of the Académie des Beaux Arts. At the Beaux-Arts he taught a clinical architecture studio with André Leconte, a former student and winner of the 1927 Prix de Rome, the distinguished Atelier Pontremoli-Leconte. Pontremoli was appointed director of the Beaux-Arts in 1932 and is credited with shepherding the school, whose name had become synonymous with neoclassicism, into the twentieth century.

Pontremoli is best known for his architectural creation of Villa Kerylos for Théodore and Fanny Reinach at Beaulieu-sur-Mer and for the Institute for Human Paleontology in Paris for Albert I, Prince of Monaco.

The Avenue Emmanuel Pontremoli in Nice is named in his memory.

Gallery

References

External links 
 Emmanuel Pontremoli at Culturespaces

1865 births
1956 deaths
20th-century French architects
Prix de Rome for architecture
Members of the Académie des beaux-arts
People from Nice
École des Beaux-Arts alumni
Academic staff of the École des Beaux-Arts